"Chumma" (English: Kiss) is a Bengali song from the 2018 Bangladeshi political drama film, Ami Neta Hobo. The song written by Sudip Kumar Dip and music directed by Akaash Sen. The song is sung by Pritam featuring Jemi Yasmin and Bonny (RAP). The music video of the track features superstar Shakib Khan and Bidya Sinha Mim. The song also choreographed by Tanjil Alam and Ramim Raj was the designer, Previously they work together in the song Lal Lipstick.

Release and response
After releasing first song Lal Lipstick, the second song of the film was released on 28 January 2018 in the banner of Eskay Music. The song performed by Indian singer  Pritam and Jemi Yasmin. The song also rap by Bonny. The track featured superstar Shakib Khan & Bidya Sinha Mim and the music video was shot in Bangkok. The video also received an overwhelming response on YouTube channel and becoming the fastest Bengali language video track that reach 1 million views within 36 Hours after Harabo Toke. The track received praises from audiences and critics.

Critical reception 
The song received mostly positive reaction from the music critics.

See also
 O Priya Tumi Kothay

References

External links
 Chumma song Lyrics

Bangladeshi film songs
2018 songs
Bengali film songs